Gerald John Ryan (24 May 1887 – 6 February 1917) was an Australian rules footballer who played with Essendon in the Victorian Football League. He died while on active service during World War I, due to head injuries sustained after falling on ice in England.

See also
 List of Victorian Football League players who died in active service

Sources
Holmesby, Russell & Main, Jim (2007). The Encyclopedia of AFL Footballers. 7th ed. Melbourne: Bas Publishing.

1887 births
1917 deaths
Australian rules footballers from Victoria (Australia)
Essendon Football Club players
Horsham Football Club players
Australian military personnel killed in World War I
Accidental deaths in England
Accidental deaths from falls